Windsong Records is a record label based in Snowmass, Colorado, that was founded by John Denver in 1976.

The label primarily caters to folk music artists and bands, and has signed acts such as Denver, Starland Vocal Band (and its precursor, Fat City), Maxine Nightingale, Johnny's Dance Band, Nanette Mancini, and Tom Crum. Founded as a subsidiary of RCA Records under the name Windsong Records, Windstar became an independent label in 1986, when RCA and Denver parted. 

Denver and RCA were not on particularly good terms towards the end of their partnership due to a change in management at RCA with executives not particularly interested in Denver's genre of music.  Also, after being purchased by General Electric (a company with military contracts) in 1985, RCA decided to part ways with Denver after what some would consider his controversial song "What Are We Making Weapons For (Let Us Begin)" appeared on his (last) RCA labelled album One World.

External links
The Windstar Foundation

References

American record labels
Record labels established in 1976
Vanity record labels
John Denver